Zenon Burzawa (born 1 July 1961) is a retired Polish football striker and later manager. He was the Ekstraklasa top goalscorer in 1993–94.

References

1961 births
Living people
Polish footballers
Stilon Gorzów Wielkopolski players
Lyon La Duchère players
Aluminium Konin players
Association football forwards
Polish expatriate footballers
Expatriate footballers in France
Polish expatriate sportspeople in France
Polish football managers
GKP Gorzów Wielkopolski managers
Sportspeople from Gorzów Wielkopolski